Matagaia is a genus of jumping spiders. Its only species, M. chromatopus, was only found on Fernando de Noronha Island, an isolated group of volcanic islands located in the South Equatorial Atlantic, about 350 km from the nearest Brazilian mainland.

Description
M. chromatopus is similar to the genus Icius in general appearance, sexual dimorphism and male palp structure. Females are almost 5 mm long, with males less than 4 mm.

Name
The species name refers to the male leg coloration, and is said to be derived from ancient Greek chromos "color" and pus "foot". Ιn ancient Greek, "color" and "foot" are respectively chrōma (χρῶμα, genitive χρῶματος) and pous (πούς).

Notes

References
  (2007): Spiders from Fernando de Noronha, Brazil. Part II. Proposal of a new genus and description of three new species of jumping spiders (Araneae, Salticidae). Revista Brasileira de Zoologia 24(3): 771-776. PDF
  (2008): The world spider catalog, version 9.0. American Museum of Natural History.

Salticidae
Spiders of South America
Monotypic Salticidae genera